The 30th Directors Guild of America Awards, honoring the outstanding directorial achievements in film and television in 1977, were presented in 1978.

Winners and nominees

Film

Television

Honorary Life Member
 David Butler

External links
 

Directors Guild of America Awards
1977 film awards
1977 television awards
Direct
Direct
Directors